Kelly Diane Willis (born October 2, 1968) is an American country music singer-songwriter, whose music has been described as alternative country and new traditionalist.

Early life
Born in Lawton, Oklahoma, United States, Willis was the youngest of three children.   While her father was a U.S. Army colonel, Willis's mother had a strong interest in music and sang and acted in amateur musicals.  Willis began singing when she was nine as a way to comfort herself after her parents divorced. After the divorce, Willis and her siblings lived with her father and moved around the country to accommodate her father's military job. She spent her middle school years in North Carolina and her high school years in Annandale, Virginia.

Career
Heavily influenced by her mother, who used to sing in local musicals, Kelly became interested in music. One day during a high school visit to the beach, she entered a nearby pay recording booth and sang her own version of Elvis Presley's "Teddy Bear." With the demo in hand, Willis impressed her then boyfriend, drummer Mas Palermo, and joined his rockabilly band at the age of 16. The band took her on as the lead vocalist and soon rechristened the band Kelly Willis & the Fireballs.  After Willis's high school graduation, the band decided to move to Austin, Texas, to participate in the vibrant Austin music scene.  After a few months in Austin, however, the band broke up.  Willis and Palermo, married in 1989, formed a new band called Radio Ranch.  In Austin, Willis attracted the notice of several influential Texas singer-songwriters including Nanci Griffith and Lyle Lovett.  Griffith introduced MCA producer Tony Brown to Willis. Brown was very impressed with Willis's vocal abilities and signed her to the MCA label in 1989.

MCA embarked on a big marketing campaign to tout Willis after she recorded her first album on the label, the 1990 album Well Travelled Love. MCA ensured that Willis was interviewed by several national magazines including unusual venues like Vogue and Mademoiselle.  Her voice appeared in the 1991 Ridley Scott-produced movie Thelma and Louise, singing "Little Honey." Willis also had a small part in Tim Robbins’ 1992 film Bob Roberts.  Willis appears as the young woman standing in a shallow stream in Dwight Yoakam's video of "A Thousand Miles from Nowhere," as well as a member of Vince Gill's "pickup band" in his Don't Let Our Love Start Slippin' Away video. She was also nominated for Top New Female Vocalist of the year at the 1993 ACM Awards along with Faith Hill and Lari White (Hill wound up winning the award). Despite of all the publicity and positive reviews from most reviewers, Well Travelled Love and Willis's subsequent albums for MCA (Bang Bang in 1991 and Kelly Willis in 1993) sold modestly and received very little radio play. During this time, Willis felt uncomfortable with the way she was marketed by MCA.  In 1994, MCA released Willis from her contract.

In 1995, Willis collaborated with Jay Farrar on the song "Rex's Blues", which appeared on the AIDS benefit album Red Hot + Bothered produced by the Red Hot Organization.

Willis continued to pursue her music career after leaving MCA.  In 1996, she recorded an EP for A&M Records entitled Fading Fast.  However, her relationship with A&M was short-lived; after working with two major labels, Willis decided to record her next album on her own.  Her efforts resulted in the 1999 album What I Deserve, which Willis sold to Rykodisc after finishing the album.  What I Deserve received quite a bit of press after the album's release. It was commonly seen as Willis's response to her history with MCA, and was uniformly praised by critics, becoming a hit for Willis.

Willis was also a judge for the 2nd annual Independent Music Awards to support independent artists' careers.

In 2003, Willis and Bruce Robison, her husband and fellow country musician, released the record Happy Holidays, a cover album of Christmas songs. Starting in 2005, Willis and Robison appeared in television and radio commercials for the anti-allergy product Claritin.

In Fall 2007, Willis released Translated From Love. It was recorded at Robison's studio, Premium Recording Services, in Austin, TX. and produced by Chuck Prophet, formerly of the band Green On Red. The album is co-written by Willis, Prophet and notable songwriter Jules Shear, and includes a cover version of Iggy Pop's "Success."

In early 2008, Willis announced she would take an indefinite hiatus from live performances due to family obligations.  Said Willis in a website announcement, "Being a traveling musician with four kids may not make an extremely compelling reality TV show but it is kicking my butt. I plan to continue making records. And I may do the occasional holiday show/song swap/benefit here and there.... Happy trails...until we meet again."   Her winter / spring 2008 scheduled dates continued as planned until the final show May 2, 2008.

Willis has recently begun to tour outside of Texas again; first she headlined the Northern Rockies Folk Festival in Hailey, Idaho on August 7, 2010. Next up, she performed at the Hardly Strictly Bluegrass Festival at Speedway Meadow in Golden Gate Park in San Francisco on October 2, 2010. In 2011, Willis toured the United States with her husband Bruce Robison, performing new songs in preparation for an album with Robison. The album, Cheater's Game, was released on February 12, 2013. Willis and Robison began to tour to support the release on February 13, 2013, in New York City. The couple followed up the success of their first album together 14 months later with the release of Our Year.

In 2018, Willis released Back Being Blue, her first solo album in more than a decade. The album was produced by her husband.

Personal life
Willis married high school boyfriend Mas Palermo in 1989, but they divorced in 1991.  In 1992, Willis met Austin singer-songwriter Bruce Robison. After several years of dating, Willis and Robison married in 1996. 

After a decade focused on her music career, Willis turned to starting a family. She went through in vitro fertilization treatments, and gave birth to son Deral Otis in January 2001.  Willis's experience with raising a child led to a different sort of album than the earlier What I Deserve.  In 2002, Willis released Easy.  The album expresses Willis's contentment with her new life through songs with a relaxed, mellow vibe.  After the album's release, Willis became pregnant again and gave birth to twins Abigail Esme and Benjamin James on March 24, 2003 On January 10, 2006, Kelly welcomed 4th child Joseph Willis Robison; he weighed 8 lbs 14 oz and was 19.75 inches long.

On January 21, 2022, Willis and Robison announced their upcoming divorce via their Facebook pages.

Discography

Albums

Singles

Notes:
A "I Don't Want to Love You (But I Do)" did not chart on Hot Country Songs, but peaked at No. 3 on Hot Country Radio Breakouts.
B "River of Love" did not chart on Hot Country Songs, but peaked at No. 10 on Hot Country Radio Breakouts.

Music videos

Appears on
 1991: Various Artists – "Thelma & Louise" (Original Motion Picture Soundtrack) – vocals on track 6, "Little Honey"
 1994: Monte Warden – "Monte Warden" (Watermelon Records) – vocals on track 5, "The Only One"
 1995: Aaron Neville – "The Tattooed Heart" (A&M Records) vocals on track 11, "For the Good Times"
 1998: Various Artists – "Real: The Tom T Hall Project" (Sire Records) – vocals on track 2, "That's How I Got to Memphis"
 2005: Various Artists – "A Tribute to Billy Joe Shaver (LIVE)" (Compadre) – vocals on track 3, "Ride Me Down Easy"
 2012: Martin Zellar – "Roosters Crow" (Label: Owen Lee Recordings) – vocals on track 1, "Took the Poison" and track 3, "Running on Pure Fear"
 2012: Mark Collie & His Reckless Companions – "Alive at Brushy Mountain State Penitentiary" (Ranch Records) – vocals on tracks 4, 5, 9

See also 
 Music of Austin

Further reading
 Corcoran, Michael. "Happy holidays, from Kelly and Bruce; A songwriting duo's Christmas: The children will nestle all snug in their beds, while Mom and Dad's records dance in our heads." The Austin American-Statesman November 25, 2003: E1+.
 House, Silas. "Nothing to Fear." No Depression July–August 2002: 72–81.
 Manheim, James M. "Kelly Willis." Contemporary Musicians. Vol. 12. Detroit: Gale, 1994. 278–280.
 Patoski, Joe Nick. "What She Deserves." Texas Monthly March 1999: 114–116. 
 Exclaim! – Interview with Kelly Willis – Exclaim! September 2007

References

External links

 
 
 [ Kelly Willis at Allmusic.com]
 [| Kelly Willis Discography]
 

1968 births
American women country singers
American country singer-songwriters
Living people
Musicians from Austin, Texas
People from Lawton, Oklahoma
Rykodisc artists
MCA Records artists
A&M Records artists
Singer-songwriters from Texas
Singer-songwriters from Oklahoma
Country musicians from Texas
Country musicians from Oklahoma
21st-century American women